Thomas Huckle Weller (June 15, 1915 – August 23, 2008) was an American virologist.  He, John Franklin Enders and  Frederick Chapman Robbins were awarded a Nobel Prize in Physiology or Medicine in 1954 for showing how to cultivate poliomyelitis viruses in a test tube, using a combination of human embryonic skin and muscle tissue.

Weller was born and grew up in Ann Arbor, Michigan, and then went to the University of Michigan, where his father Carl Vernon Weller was a professor in the Department of Pathology. At Michigan, he studied medical zoology and received a B.S. and an M.S., with his masters thesis on fish parasites.  In 1936, Weller entered Harvard Medical School, and in 1939 began working under John Franklin Enders, with whom he would later (along with Frederick Chapman Robbins) share the Nobel Prize. It was Enders who got Weller involved in researching viruses and tissue-culture techniques for determining infectious disease causes. Weller received his MD in 1940, and went to work at Children's Hospital in Boston. In 1942, during World War II, he entered the Army Medical Corps and was stationed at the Antilles Medical Laboratory in Puerto Rico, earning the rank of Major and heading the facility's Departments of Bacteriology, Virology and Parasitology. After the War, he returned to Children's Hospital in Boston, and it was there in 1947, that he rejoined Enders in the newly created Research Division of Infectious Diseases. After several leading positions, in July 1954, he was appointed Tropical Public Health Department head at the Harvard School of Public Health. Weller also served from 1953 to 1959 as director of the Commission on Parasitic Diseases of the American Armed Forces Epidemiological Board.  In 1954 he was awarded the George Ledlie prize in recognition of his research on rubella, polio and cytomegalovirus(CMV) viruses.

In addition to his research on polio, for which he won the Nobel Prize, Weller also contributed to treating schistosomiasis, and Coxsackie viruses. He was also the first to isolate the virus responsible for varicella.

In 1945, Weller married Kathleen Fahey, who died in 2011 aged 95. They had two sons and two daughters.

Citations

References

External links
 including the Nobel Lecture, December 11, 1954 The Cultivation of the Poliomyelitis Viruses in Tissue Culture
Thomas Huckle Weller papers, 1896-2007 (inclusive), 1940-1990 (bulk). H MS c357. Harvard Medical Library, Francis A. Countway Library of Medicine, Boston, Mass.

1915 births
2008 deaths
American Nobel laureates
American virologists
Nobel laureates in Physiology or Medicine
People from Ann Arbor, Michigan
People from Needham, Massachusetts
University of Michigan College of Literature, Science, and the Arts alumni
Harvard Medical School alumni
Harvard School of Public Health faculty
Members of the United States National Academy of Sciences
Polio
Presidents of the American Society of Tropical Medicine and Hygiene
Members of the National Academy of Medicine